Henry Prittie, 1st Baron Dunalley (3 October 1743 – 3 January 1801) was an Irish peer and Member of Parliament.

Prittie was the son of Henry Prittie of Kilboy, County Tipperary. He was elected to the Irish House of Commons for Banagher in 1767, a seat he held until 1768. He then represented Gowran from 1769 to 1776 and Tipperary from 1776 to 1790. Prittie was appointed High Sheriff of Tipperary in 1770. He was raised to the Peerage of Ireland as Baron Dunalley, of Kilboy, in the County of Tipperary on 31 July 1800.

Lord Dunalley married Catherine Sadlier, daughter of Francis Sadlier. They had seven children:

 Henry Sadleir (3 May 1775 – 10 October 1854)
 Francis Aldborough (4 June 1779 – 8 March 1853), married firstly Martha Hartpole (d. 1802) daughter of Cook Otway, married secondly Elizabeth Ponsonby (d. 11 January 1849), they had six children including Henry Prittie (January 1807 – 10 September 1885) the 3rd Baron Dunalley.
 Catherine (d. 13 November 1855)
 Deborah (d. 8 Jun 1829)
 Mary (d. 12 February 1859)
 Martha (d. 13 January 1820)
 Elizabeth (d.20 April 1802)

Baron Dunalley died in May 1801, aged 57, and was succeeded in the barony by his son Henry. Lady Catherine died on 26 February 1821.

Notes

References 
Kidd, Charles, Williamson, David (editors). Debrett's Peerage and Baronetage (1990 edition). New York: St Martin's Press, 1990, 

1743 births
1801 deaths
Barons in the Peerage of Ireland
Peers of Ireland created by George III
High Sheriffs of Tipperary
Irish MPs 1761–1768
Irish MPs 1769–1776
Irish MPs 1776–1783
Irish MPs 1783–1790
Members of the Parliament of Ireland (pre-1801) for King's County constituencies
Members of the Parliament of Ireland (pre-1801) for County Kilkenny constituencies
Members of the Parliament of Ireland (pre-1801) for County Tipperary constituencies